The EMD F9 is a  Diesel-electric locomotive produced between February 1953 and May 1960 by the Electro-Motive Division of General Motors (EMD) and General Motors Diesel (GMD). It succeeded the F7 model in GM-EMD's F-unit sequence. Final assembly was at GM-EMD's La Grange, Illinois plant. The F9 was also built in Canada by General Motors Diesel at their London, Ontario plant.  A total of 101 cab-equipped lead A units and 156 cabless booster B units were built. The F9 was the fifth model in GM-EMD's highly successful "F" series of cab unit diesel locomotives.

A F9 can be distinguished reliably from a late F7 only by the addition of an extra filter grille ahead of the front porthole on the side panels on A units.

By the time cab units such as the F9 were built, railroads were turning to the road switcher-style of locomotive, and the F9 was succeeded in most part by the EMD GP9.

Engine and powertrain 
The F9 used a 16-cylinder 567C series Diesel engine developing  at 800 rpm. A D.C. generator powered four D37 traction motors, two on each Blomberg B truck. EMD has built all of its major components since 1939.

Original buyers

Locomotives built by EMD at La Grange, Illinois

Locomotives built by GMD at London, Ontario

See also 

List of GM-EMD locomotives
List of GMD Locomotives

References

Notes

Bibliography

External links 
 
 EMD F9 and F9B locomotives data sheet

B-B locomotives
F09
F09
Diesel-electric locomotives of the United States
Railway locomotives introduced in 1953
Locomotives with cabless variants
Standard gauge locomotives of Canada
Passenger locomotives
Standard gauge locomotives of the United States
Standard gauge locomotives of Mexico
Diesel-electric locomotives of Canada
Diesel-electric locomotives of Mexico
Streamlined diesel locomotives